For the sportscaster, see Stuart Scott. For the aviator, see Blanche Stuart Scott.

Stuart Nash Scott (December 6, 1906 – February 26, 1992) was an American lawyer and diplomat. He briefly served as United States Ambassador to Portugal.

Biography
Scott was born in Madison, Wisconsin. He was a member of the Council on Foreign Relations. He served as United States Ambassador to Portugal from 1973 to 1974, when he was dismissed by Henry Kissinger because he did not share Kissinger's opinion that a communist takeover was imminent. He died of a stroke at his home in New York in 1992.

References

1906 births
1992 deaths
Lawyers from Madison, Wisconsin
Ambassadors of the United States to Portugal
20th-century American lawyers